USS Vigil (AGR/YAGR-12) was a , converted from a Liberty Ship, acquired by the US Navy in 1956. She was reconfigured as a radar picket ship and assigned to radar picket duty in the North Atlantic Ocean as part of the Distant Early Warning Line.

Construction
Vigil (YAGR-12) was laid down on 14 December 1944, under a Maritime Commission (MARCOM) contract, MC hull 2339, as the Liberty Ship Raymond Van Brogan, by J.A. Jones Construction, Panama City, Florida. She was launched 27 January 1945; sponsored by Mrs. Mary Anne Durham, wife of manager machinery JAJCC; and delivered 10 February 1945, to the War Shipping Administration.

Service history

Merchant service
Following a shakedown cruise in the Gulf of Mexico, the ship transited the Panama Canal, on 19 February, and headed for Terminal Island, California, where she was turned over to A.H.Bull & Co.Inc., for operation under contract to the War Shipping Administration.

She performed several resupply missions in the Pacific Ocean theater, carrying aircraft as well as other materiel and some troops.

Following the end of World War II, the War Shipping Administration transferred her contract to the Waterman Steamship Corporation, which firm operated her from Mobile, Alabama. In the summer of 1947, Raymond Van Brogan was taken out of service and berthed with the National Defense Reserve Fleet at Mobile.

U.S. Navy service
Nine years later, in June 1956, she was brought out of the US Maritime Commission's (MARCOM) reserve fleet for conversion to a radar picket ship and active service with the Navy. She was moved to Philadelphia, Pennsylvania, where she completed her conversion at the naval shipyard.

On 7 August 1956, she received a new name and her Navy hull designation to become Vigil (YAGR-12). She completed conversion early in 1957, and was placed in service on 5 March 1957.
 
During Vigils eight-year naval career, she was assigned to the Continental Air Defense Command (CONAD) and served as one of that organization's radar picket ships operating as seaward extensions of its Contiguous Radar Coverage System. The ship operated out of Davisville, Rhode Island, during her entire period of service, and spent on the average of 200 days per year engaged in picket patrols in waters off the coast of New England.

On 28 September 1958, she was redesignated AGR-12, thereby dropping her yard craft designation and becoming a commissioned auxiliary.

Decommissioning
On 3 March 1965, Vigil was placed out of commission. Her name was struck from the Navy List on 1 April 1965, and she was returned to the MARCOM for lay up with the Hudson River Reserve Fleet, Jones Point, New York. On 23 November 1970, she was sold to the Spanish firm, Revalorizacion de Materiales, for scrapping.

Honors and awards
Vigils crew was eligible for the following medals:
 Navy Expeditionary Medal (2-Cuba)
 National Defense Service Medal

References

Bibliography

External links 
 

 

Liberty ships
Ships built in Panama City, Florida
1945 ships
World War II merchant ships of the United States
Guardian-class radar picket ships
Cold War auxiliary ships of the United States
Mobile Reserve Fleet
Hudson River Reserve Fleet